Hayman Island is the most northerly of the Whitsunday Islands, off the coast of Central Queensland in the locality of Whitsundays in the Whitsunday Region, Queensland, Australia. It is a private island open to the public, most famous for its luxury resort which was built in the 1950s by Ansett Transport Industries. The island is a significant for tourism in Queensland. The resort is managed by the InterContinental Hotels Group.

History
Captain James Cook first charted these waters on his voyage in 1770.

In 1866, hydrographer Commander George Nares gave Hayman its name in honour of Thomas Hayman, the master of HMS Salamander in which they were travelling. The two carried out many exploits together, becoming the first to pass through the Suez Canal and completing a dangerous navigation around Antarctica.

Edwin Embury, a schoolteacher, dreamer, and amateur scientist established a biological research laboratory on the island in 1933. The abundant wildlife and proximity to the Great Barrier Reef made Hayman an ideal base for scientific discovery.

Whitsundays' fishermen Bob and Bert Hallam established the Great Barrier Reef Game Fish Angling Club in 1935, attracting local and international game fishing enthusiasts who arrived by coastal steamer. One of them was Zane Grey, American novelist, filmmaker and big game fisherman. Grey planted the first coconut palm on the island and, in 1936, Hayman became the idyllic tropical backdrop for his comedy drama film White Death.

In 1947, Ansett Transport Industries acquired the island. Work began on the Royal Hayman Hotel, which was opened in 1950 by Australian Deputy Prime Minister, Arthur Fadden in anticipation of a royal visit to Australia, for which Hayman was granted a Royal Charter.

Arrival on Hayman was by Catalina and Sandringham flying boat.

In July 1985, a two-year, $300 million project commenced to transform the island into a luxury resort. The works were carried out by Thiess Contractors and in 1987 Hayman was invited to join The Leading Hotels of the World.

In May 1998, Hayman Island was sold to the BT Hotel Group.

The resort undertook another significant renovation in 2001 and received many of its modern five-star luxury amenities.
In June 2004, Mulpha Australia acquired Hayman, and, in January 2010, after almost six years of planning, design and environmental consultations, the final approvals were granted. The initial phase of this strategic plan has included revitalisation of the Hayman pool and the construction of luxurious new Kerry Hill designed beach villas.

Hayman re-opened on 1 August 2011 after five months of extensive restoration on the island, due to the severe impact of Tropical Cyclone Anthony and Cyclone Yasi earlier that year. This period of closure enabled Hayman to complete the repairs required to landscapes, guest and accommodation areas, activity facilities and essential infrastructure as well as undertake other planned projects.

In the surrounds of the resort, a new botanical garden has some 33,000 new plants and 327 new plant species having been introduced by landscape designer, horticulturalist and personality, Jamie Durie, who was engaged to replant Hayman's 16 hectares of gardens.

Transport
Guests to the island arrive by Hayman's private fleet of luxury motor yachts, and private charter helicopter or Air Whitsunday seaplane.

Popular culture
Hayman Island contributed to Australian popular culture when the television series Barrier Reef began filming at Hayman in 1969.

In 1972, the first people to row unaided across the Pacific Ocean, Sylvia Cook and John Fairfax arrived at Hayman Island after spending 361 days crossing the ocean.

In 1995, British Labour Party leader Tony Blair addressed Rupert Murdoch and the leaders of News Corporation at Hayman Island, laying the groundwork for Murdoch's eventual support of the party at the 1997 election.

Notable guests have included Jane Fonda, Bill Gates, Bob Geldof, Anthony Hopkins, Chris Isaak, Nicole Kidman, Kellan Lutz, Slash and Rod Stewart.

See also

 Air Whitsunday
 List of islands of Australia
 Tourism in Australia

References

External links

Official website

Whitsunday Islands
Ansett Australia
InterContinental hotels
Islands of Queensland
Private islands of Australia